Mr & Mrs Bund is a French restaurant by chef Paul Pairet in Shanghai's Chartered Bank Building, in China. Frommer's has rated the restaurant 2 out of 3 stars.

See also

 List of French restaurants

References

External links
 

French restaurants in China
Restaurants in Shanghai
The Bund